Vanja Drkušić (born 30 October 1999) is a Slovenian footballer who plays as a defender for Russian club Sochi.

Club career

In December 2015, Drkušić joined Dutch top-flight side Heerenveen, after receiving interest from Maribor, Dinamo Zagreb and Atalanta. In August 2019, he signed for Rende in the Italian third division. Before the second half of 2019–20, Drkušić signed for Slovenian team Bravo. On 23 February 2020, he debuted for Bravo during a 2–1 win against Tabor Sežana. On 11 July 2020, Drkušić scored his first goal for Bravo during a 1–1 draw with Domžale.

On 24 January 2022, Drkušić signed for Russian Premier League side Sochi for an alleged fee of €100,000. On 27 August 2022, he extended his contract with Sochi to 2025.

Career statistics

References

External links
 

1999 births
Living people
Sportspeople from Novo Mesto
Slovenian footballers
Slovenia youth international footballers
Slovenia under-21 international footballers
Association football defenders
SC Heerenveen players
Rende Calcio 1968 players
NK Bravo players
PFC Sochi players
Slovenian PrvaLiga players
Russian Premier League players
Slovenian expatriate footballers
Slovenian expatriate sportspeople in the Netherlands
Slovenian expatriate sportspeople in Italy
Slovenian expatriate sportspeople in Russia
Expatriate footballers in the Netherlands
Expatriate footballers in Italy
Expatriate footballers in Russia